Be'er Ganim (lit. Gardens Well) is a community settlement in southern Israel.

History
The village was established in 2012 in order to house former settlers who had been evacuated from the Gaza Strip.

References

External links
Village website

Community settlements
Populated places established in 2012
2012 establishments in Israel